Herman Carl Andersen (January 27, 1897 – July 26, 1978) was a U.S. Representative from Minnesota.

Background
Herman Carl Andersen was born in Newcastle, Washington. He was the son of Charles Carl Andersen (1858-1940?) and Lorena Nielson (1868–1946). Charles C. Andersen had emigrated from Denmark to the United States in the late 1870s. The family moved to a farm near Tyler, Minnesota in 1901. Andersen's father returned to mining and became superintendent of a large coal mine owned by Northern Pacific Railway at Red Lodge, Montana, where Andersen graduated from high school in 1913. He attended the University of Washington and later the U.S. Naval Academy. While aboard the battleship  in 1917, a gun blast partially impaired his hearing and he was unable to qualify for further service.

Career
Andersen engaged in cattle raising and agricultural pursuits 1919 – 1925 and as a civil engineer 1925 – 1930. From 1926 to 1928 he was employed in the Muscle Shoals, Alabama. He resumed agricultural pursuits near Tyler, Minnesota, 1930 – 1938. He served as member of the Minnesota House of Representatives for one term from 1935 to 1937. He was elected as a Republican to the 76th, 77th, 78th, 79th, 80th, 81st, 82nd, 83rd, 84th, 85th, 86th and 87th congresses from 1939 to 1963. Andersen voted in favor of the Civil Rights Acts of 1957 and 1960, but voted present on the 24th Amendment to the U.S. Constitution.

In the 1962 election, his district was eliminated as part of redistricting. He also faced backlash from the Republican party related to a business deal with fraudster Billie Sol Estes. He lost the Republican primary election to Robert J. Odegard (who in turn lost to Democrat Alec G. Olson in the general election) and did not return to politics.

Later years
After leaving politics, Andersen retired to Falls Church, Virginia where he ran a small business and managed his farming interests in Minnesota. He died in 1978. He was cremated and his ashes interred in Danebod Lutheran Cemetery in Tyler, Minnesota.

See also
U.S. Congressional Delegations from Minnesota

References

External links
The H. Carl Andersen Papers, including records of his congressional service, are available for research use at the Minnesota Historical Society.

1897 births
1978 deaths
People from Newcastle, Washington
American people of Danish descent
Lutherans from Minnesota
Republican Party members of the United States House of Representatives from Minnesota
Minnesota Independents
Members of the Minnesota House of Representatives
People from Tyler, Minnesota
20th-century American politicians
20th-century Lutherans
United States Navy officers
United States Naval Academy alumni
Military personnel from Washington (state)
Military personnel from Minnesota